The Yūshi no Kai is a parliamentary group of the Japanese House of Representatives.

History 
The group was formed on November 4, 2021, and submitted a notice of formation of the parliamentary group to the secretariat of the House of Representatives, which was accepted. It is composed of five independent members of the opposition who were elected in the 2021 general election, and all five have experience of belonging to the Democratic Party of Japan, Democratic Party, and Kibō no Tō.

The spokesperson of the group is Shuji Kira from Oita 1st District. On November 4, 2021, Shuji Kira said, "It's a blank slate. We'll think about it while checking the situation," when asked if he would form a unified parliamentary group with the Constitutional Democratic Party.

Parliamentarians from the group

See also 

 Parliamentary group

References

External links 

 List of parliamentary members by parliamentary group

Political parties established in 2021
2021 establishments in Japan